Grigor Stavrev Parlichev (also spelled Prlichev, Parlitcheff or Prličev; ;) was a Bulgarian writer, teacher and translator. He was born on January 18, 1830, in Ohrid, Ottoman Empire and died in the same town on January 25, 1893. Although he thought of himself as a Bulgarian, according to the Macedonian historiography he was an ethnic Macedonian.

Biography 
Parlichev studied in a Greek school in Ohrid. In the 1850s he worked as a teacher of Greek in the towns of Tirana, Prilep and Ohrid. In 1858 Parlichev started studying medicine in Athens but transferred to the Faculty of Linguistics in 1860. The same year he took part in the annual poetic competition in Athens winning first prize for his poem "O Armatolos" (Ο Αρματωλός), written in Greek. Acclaimed as "second Homer", he was offered scholarships to the universities at Oxford and Berlin. At that time he was pretending to be a Greek, but the public opinion in Athens emphasized his non-Greek origin. Disappointed Parlichev declined offered scholarships and returned to Ohrid the next year.

In 1862 Parlichev joined the struggle for independent Bulgarian church and schools, though he continued to teach Greek. After spending some time in Constantinople in 1868 acquainting himself with Church Slavonic literature, he returned to Ohrid where he advocated the substitution of Greek with Bulgarian in the town's schools and churches. The same year Parlichev was arrested and spent several months in an Ottoman jail after a complaint was sent by the Greek bishop of Ohrid. At that time he began to study standard Bulgarian, or, as he called it himself, the Slavonic language. From this time until his death Parlichev continued writing only in Bulgarian.

From 1869 Parlichev taught Bulgarian in several towns across Ottoman Empire, including Struga, Gabrovo, Bitola, Ohrid and Thessaloniki. He initiated the creation of the Bulgarian Men's High School of Thessaloniki. In 1870 Parlichev translated his award-winning poem "O Armatolos" into Bulgarian in an attempt to popularize his earlier works, which were written in Greek, among the Bulgarian audience.  He also wrote another poem called "Skenderbeg". Parlichev was the first Bulgarian translator of Homer's Iliad in 1871, though he was criticised for his language. Parlichev used a specific mixture of Church Slavonic and his native Ohrid dialect. He is therefore also regarded as a founding figure of the literature of the later standardized Macedonian language. In 1883 Parlichev moved to Thessaloniki where he taught at the Thessaloniki Bulgarian Male High School (1883-1889). During his stay there he wrote his autobiography. After his retirement in 1890, he returned to Ohrid, where he died.

Parlichev's son Kiril Parlichev was also a prominent member of the revolutionary movement in Macedonia and a Bulgarian public figure.

Identification 

Per Raymond Detrez, who received his PhD on the issue, in his early life Parlichev was a member of the “Romaic community”, a multi-ethnic proto-nation, to comprise all Orthodox Christians of the Ottoman Empire. It had been under way until the 1830s, when the rise of Greek nationalism destroyed which later lead to the formation of the modern nations on the Balkans. Parlichev is seen by Detrez as belonging to this community, however initially he had no well-defined sense of national identification. In his youth he developed a vague Greek identity, but as an adult he adopted a Bulgarian national identity. In the last decade of his life, he adhered to a form of vague local Macedonian patriotism, though continued to identify himself as a Bulgarian. In this way Parlichev’s national identity has been used by Macedonian historians to prove the existence of a Macedonian ethnic identification during the late 19th century.

Language 
As a child, Parlichev learned to write excellent Greek and later mastered literary Greek better than a native speaker. However, as an adult, despite his Bulgarian self-identification, Parlichev had poor knowledge of standard Bulgarian, which appeared to him as a "foreign language". He started learning to read and write in Bulgarian only after his return from Athens in 1862. In his autobiography, Parlichev wrote: "I was, and I am still weak with the Bulgarian language," and "In Greek I sang like a swan, now in Slavic I cannot even sing like a donkey." The then-developing literary Bulgarian language was based on the easternmost Eastern South Slavic dialects, while his native dialect belongs to the western dialects. He used a mix of Church Slavonic and Bulgarian words and forms, as well as elements typical of his native Ohrid dialect, calling it Common Slavic. He also wanted to enrich the new standard language with elements taken from the Russian language. Because of this, he was criticized for his translation of Homer's Iliad. Thus, Parlichev reacted against this critic, withdrawing into "an alternative Macedonian regional identity, a kind of Macedonian particularism." However, when he came to write his autobiography, Parlichev used the Bulgarian literary language.

See also 
  Miladinov Brothers
  Bulgarian Millet  
  Macedonian nationalism

References and notes

Further reading

Parlichev's Autobiography
 Parlichev, Grigor. Автобиография. Сборник за народни умотворения, наука и книжнина, book IX, Sofia (1894). 
 Parlichev, Grigor. Автобиографија. Skopje, 1967 (scan) .

Biographies
 Parlichev, Kiril. Към характеристика на Григор С. Пърличев (Towards a Characteristic of Grigor S. Parlichev), Macedonian Review 4, book 2, p. 99 (1928). 
 Matov, Dimitar. Гр. С. Пърличев. Книжовно биографически чертици (Gr. S. Parlichev: A Literary and Biographical Outline), Balgarski Pregled, book 4-5 (1895).

Historical context
 Shapkarev, Kuzman. Материали за възраждането на българщината в Македония от 1854 до 1884 г. Неиздадени записки и писма (Materials about the Bulgarian Revival in Macedonia from 1854 to 1884. Unpublished Notes and Letters). Balgarski Pisatel, Sofia (1984)  
 Sprostranov, Evtim. По възражданьето в град Охрид (On the Revival in the City of Ohrid), Сборникъ за Народни Умотворения, Наука и Книжнина, book XIII, Sofia, pp 621–681 (1896)   

1830 births
1893 deaths
People from Ohrid
Bulgarian educators
19th-century Bulgarian poets
Bulgarian male poets
Bulgarian writers
Bulgarian translators
Macedonia under the Ottoman Empire
19th-century Bulgarian people
National and Kapodistrian University of Athens alumni
Greek-language poets
Macedonian Bulgarians
19th-century translators
19th-century male writers